The Wayne County Commission is the legislative body for Wayne County, Michigan. It is made up of 15 commissioners elected by district every two years. Wayne County, which includes the City of Detroit, is the most populous county in Michigan with 1.8 million residents. The Wayne County Commission and its employees are the legislative branch of county government. The chief role of the commission is to adopt a budget and to enact ordinances. The commission also approves contracts, appointments and rules. The money is spent and ordinances are enforced through the administrative branch.

The Commission is presided over by Chair Alisha Bell of Detroit. Chair Bell was first elected to the Commission in November 2002 as the youngest African-American woman to serve on a county commission in the country, and is serving her ninth two-year term. She also served for nine months in 2000,

Chair Bell has been extremely involved in criminal justice reform. She initiated the Stepping Up resolution which diverts people with mental illness and substance abuse from jails and into treatment. In 2019, she introduced a Cash Bail Bond reform resolution which addresses the inequity of poor persons who go to jail because they can't afford bail.

All Wayne County Commission meetings, as well as the budget sessions, are open to the public. The commission meets on the first and the third Thursday of the month at 10:00 a.m. in its chambers on the mezzanine level of the Guardian Building, 500 Griswold, Detroit. Meeting dates and agendas are published on the Commission website.

Videos of Commission and committee meetings are also available on YouTube.

In addition to the full body, the Commission has seven standing committees, along with special committees and task forces. Standing committees include: Audit; Economic Development; Government Operations; Health & Human Services; Public Safety, Judiciary & Homeland Security; Public Services and Ways and Means. Special committees includes those on Rules, which meets during the first month of each new commission term to set procedures for commission meetings, as well as Senior Citizens and Veterans Affairs and the Special Committee on the Criminal Justice Complex, which oversees construction on the county jail and courthouse complex scheduled for completion in 2022.

Every two years, the commission publishes and makes available online a booklet, A Citizens Guide to Wayne County Government detailing its functions as well as those of other branches of county government.

Composition

List of County Commissioners
This is a list of current Wayne County Commissioners in order by district. This list is current as of January 2020.

References

External links
 Wayne County Commission
A Citizen's Guide to Wayne County 
Wayne County Commission You Tube channel.

Wayne County, Michigan